The Constantin Film AG is a German mini-major film production and distribution company based in Munich. The company, which belongs to Swiss media conglomerate Highlight Communications AG, is a large independent German maker and distributor of productions in the entire field of audio-visual fiction and non-fiction. Company activity is based on the five pillars of film production/procurement of rights, TV production, film distribution, home entertainment and licence trading/TV exploitation. Constantin Film AG has released 36 of the 100 most successful German films of the last 20 years, including four of the Top 5: Manitou's Shoe (11.7 million viewers), Traumschiff Surprise – Periode 1 (9 million), Fack ju Göhte (7.3 million) and Fack ju Göhte 2 (7.7 million). The Fack ju Göhte trilogy was concluded in 2017 with Fack ju Göhte 3 (6 million viewers) and is now the most successful German film series of all time.  Internationally, Constantin Film is best known for the successful Resident Evil film franchise, which has earned  worldwide to date and is also known as the highest-grossing film series based on a video game.  Most recent successes include TV series Shadowhunters, which won four People's Choice Awards in 2018, and the live-action Resident Evil television series. Constantin has also been involved in 20th Century Fox's Fantastic Four film franchise. Other productions include bestseller adaption The Silence and Monster Hunter.

Early Constantin
Constantin Filmverleih GmbH was founded in West Germany on 1 April 1950 by Preben Philipsen and Waldfried Barthel, who would later become the head of publicity for the company. It was originally the country's national distributor of films produced by Columbia Pictures and United Artists. Throughout the 1950s, Constantin distributed both popular and art-house films from several nations as well as medium-budgeted domestic films.

Constantin's popularity grew through the late 1950s to the 1960s by not only distributing popular films but creating its own in-house talent roster of contract players (Joachim Fuchsberger, Heinz Drache), directors and producers (Wolf C. Hartwig), as well as co-financing international co-production films shot in Italy, such as the Clint Eastwood spaghetti westerns, the films of Harry Alan Towers and others using their own stable of stars. Constantin also had great success with their Jerry Cotton film series, though projected film series of Sherlock Holmes, Jules Maigret and Perry Rhodan only had one entry.

Constantin Filmverleih was renamed to Constantin Film GmbH on 21 September 1964, and on 1 July 1965, Bertelsmann Publishing became the majority shareholder of Constantin. They attempted to increase output without increasing investment that resulted in the demise of many of the studio's popular film series, investment in sex films, and a stronger emphasis on releasing films from other nations rather than shooting their own. Bertelsmann sold its shares in 1969.  The "old" Constantin Film GmbH was eventually declared bankrupt in October 1977.

New Constantin
Founded in 1979 by Bernd Eichinger, with Bernd Schaefers, as Neue Constantin Film after acquiring the assets of the bankrupt "old" Constantin Film GmbH the previous year, Constantin Film developed into the first German film distributor with its own production company in just six years, with production activities extending to the international market. In 1986, the Kirch Group (at the time Europe's biggest film and TV license traders) acquired a minority stake in Neue Constantin Film.  Eichinger retained one of the company's leading executives and a major shareholder to his death in 2011.

In the following years, Constantin Film fixed its position on the international movie market by establishing various production subsidiaries across Europe in 1996. At the end of the 1990s, Constantin Film acquired majority stakes in the film production companies Olga Film GmbH, Engram Pictures and MOOVIE GmbH. In September 1999, the company then went public on the German stock market as Constantin Film AG. Deutsche Börse placed the Constantin Film share on the selection index Nemax 50 in March 2000.
 
Constantin Film AG founded Rat Pack Filmproduktion GmbH with producer Christian Becker and his team in 2001. The Swiss Highlight Communications AG (a strategy and finance holding with the operative segments of film and sports and event marketing) acquired 23 percent of the capital stock of Constantin Film AG from Kirch Beteiligungs GmbH und Co. KG and from diversified holdings for the first time in 2002. In 2003, the board of Constantin Film AG embarked on a new strategic path for the company: the traditional business areas of production and distribution were expanded to include the three areas of license trading, home entertainment exploitation and increased TV service production (especially TV entertainment). Constantin Film AG also acquired 61 percent of the shares in KirchMedia Entertainment GmbH (now renamed Constantin Entertainment GmbH), one of the market leaders in German show and entertainment production. The stake was increased to 100 percent in 2005.
 
At the end of 2009, the listing of Constantin Film AG expired; all the shares were transferred to Highlight Communications after a squeeze-out. As of 7 October 2009, Constantin Film is no longer listed at the Frankfurter Börse.

Since January 2017 Bernhard Burgener is chairman of the supervisory board, with Martin Moszkowicz as chairman of the executive board. In this capacity, Moszkowicz is responsible for the company's film business, including worldwide production and distribution, world sales, marketing and publicity as well as corporate communication and legal affairs.

Oliver Berben has joined the Constantin Film AG Managing Board on 1 January 2017. The newly created division “TV, Entertainment and Digital Media” concentrates the development and manufacture of all national and international productions of the company that are not intended for cinema exploitation. Oliver Berben founded the MOOVIE GmbH in 1996, which became a subsidiary of Constantin Film AG in 1999. In January 2019, Oliver Berben also assumed the position of Managing Director "Production" of Constantin Film Production GmbH. Oliver Berben will continue his work as a producer.

Production
The most successful license titles and internal or co-productions in Germany include (in terms of numbers of viewers) The Never Ending Story (approx. 5 million), The Name of the Rose (5.9 million), The House of the Spirits (nearly 4 million), Dances With Wolves (nearly 6.8 million), Seven (more than 2.8 million), The Sixth Sense (more than 4 million), Maybe... Maybe Not (more than 6.6 million), Werner – Beinhart! (more than 4.9 million),  (more than 3.2 million),  (more than 2.4 million), Asterix & Obelix vs. Caesar (nearly 3.6 million), Werner – Volles Rooäää!!! (nearly 2.8 million), American Pie (more than 6 million viewers, the biggest film of 2000), Downfall (more than 4.6 million viewers. Oscar-nominated), Perfume: The Story of a Murderer (nearly 5.6 million), The Baader-Meinhof Complex (more than 2.4 million), Manitou's Shoe (the second-most successful German film ever with more than 11.7 million viewers), Dreamship Surprise – Period 1 (9 million), Lissi and the Wild Emperor (more than 2.2 million), Vicky the Viking (nearly 5 million), Nowhere in Africa (1.66 million viewers. Oscar winner for "Best Foreign Language Film" in 2003), The Wave (more than 2.5 Mio), Hui Buh (more than 2 million), The White Massai (more than 2.2. million),  (1.8 million), Horst Schlämmer – Isch kandidiere! (1.35 million),  (1.3 million), Pope Joan (2.3 million), the Wild Chicks series (3.2 million), Girls on Top (nearly 1.8 million),  (2.4 million), Suck me Shakespeer (7.3 million) and the international self-production Resident Evil (3.6 million viewers), which developed into a successful international franchise.

Controversy
In October 2021, the Writers Guild of America West advised its members not to work for the company due it not being a signatory to the 2020 Minimum Basic Agreement. However, the company hit back stating that it “has paid, and the WGA Plan has accepted, all WGA fringe payments.”

Filmographies

List of content produced by Constantin Film

List of content produced by New Constantin Film

References

External links

Constantin Film on IMDb

Film distributors of Germany
Film production companies of Germany
Companies based in Munich
Mass media companies established in 1950
German film studios
German companies established in 1950
Bertelsmann subsidiaries